Om Records is an American record label, established in 1995, which releases electronic music, dance music and hip hop. The label was founded in San Francisco in 1995 by Chris Smith. Om Records releases both artist albums and compilations, including the Om Lounge and Mushroom Jazz series. Om's roster of artists includes Groove Armada, Underworld, Dirty Vegas, Bassnectar, Indiana Taurus, J Boogie, People Under The Stairs, Samantha James, Amp Live, Greenskeepers, Hot Toddy, and Wagon Cookin. Past artists have included Kaskade, Wolfgang Gartner, Ladybug Mecca, and Juan Atkins.

Om Records also hosts nightclub events in Seattle, Los Angeles, Ibiza, Miami, Chicago, Barcelona, and London. The label is based in the Mission District of San Francisco.

Releases

Child's Play
Child's Play was started in late 2009 with the first release from Amp Live featuring Trackademicks called "Gary is A Robot". The label would go on to feature full album and single releases from the likes of Amp Live, Greenskeepers, Bassnectar, and James Curd. Treasure Fingers, Flosstradamus, Juan MacLean, Tommie Sunshine, Bassnectar, RJD2, Mexicans With Guns, Grand Theft, Blu Jemz, Robot Koch, DJ Vadim, and more have contributed to the label with remixes.

Om Hip Hop
The Om Hip Hop imprint was started in 2006 and has seen many hit indie releases including artist albums from Strange Fruit Project, Zion I & The Grouch, People Under The Stairs, J-Boogie's Dubtronic Science, Black Spade, Zeph & Azeem, Colossus, and Thes One. The label has also released a number of 12" vinyl singles from Digable Planets, Ladybug Mecca featuring Kenny Dope and Raheem DeVaughn, Zion I & The Grouch, J-Boogie's Dubtronic Science Feat. Lyrics Born, Strange Fruit Project Feat. Erykah Badu, Zeph & Azeem featuring hip hop legends Marley Marl and Carl G. and E Da Boss featuring Gift of Gab and Lateef The Truth Speaker.

Smoke N' Mirrors
Started in early 2010 as a nu-disco house label, Smoke N' Mirrors has featured singles release from Hot Toddy, Wagon Cookin, Mike Monday, Shiny Objects, and Lance DeSardi. In September 2010, Smoke N' Mirrors released the first full length artist album from Crazy P member Hot Toddy.

Deep Concentration
The original hip hop imprint created by Om in 1997 featured a series of compilations and 12" singles. Artist featured on the compilations have included Cut Chemist, DJ Swingsett, Prince Paul, Peanut Butter Wolf, X-Men, Mix Master Mike, DJ Spooky, Beat Junkies, Planet Asia, Mass Influence, Crown City Rockers, Jeremy Sole, DJ John Carmichael and more.

Colorforms
Colorforms is a 12" vinyl singles label started by Om for breaks, turntablism, and dubstep. The label featured 12"s released from Bassnectar, Ming, FS, Soulstice, and more. The art for the jackets was designed by urban street artist David P. Flores.

List of artists
The following is a partial list of artists on Om Records. 

Underworld
Groove Armada
Bassnectar
Dirty Vegas
Mark Farina
Indiana Taurus
Samantha James
DJ Colette
Ladybug Mecca
People Under The Stairs
Amp Live
Greenskeepers
Matt Edwards
Hot Toddy
J-Boogie's Dubtronic Science
Soulstice
DJ Heather
Wolfgang Gartner
Jake Childs
Lovebirds
Ming (DJ)
Atjazz
Charles Webster
Eighty Mile Beach
Strange Fruit Project
Raashan Ahmad
Thes One
Andy Caldwell
Rithma
Wagon Cookin
King Kooba
Marques Wyatt
Ming (DJ) & FS
Pezzner
Miguel Migs
Black Spade
Blaze
Derrick Carter
DJ Fluid
Afro Mystik
DJ Sneak
DJ Garth
Fish Go Deep
Mike Monday
Florian Kruse
Style of Eye
Hipp-e
Jamie Anderson
JT Donaldson
Lance DeSardi
LandShark
Home & Garden (Tim K and Timothy Shumaker)
Onionz
Gabriel Rene

See also
 List of record labels

References

External links
Official site

American record labels
Record labels established in 1995
House music record labels
Electronic dance music record labels
Electronic music record labels
1995 establishments in California